Changchow is a former romanization of:

Zhangzhou, a coastal city in southern Fujian, China
Changzhou, a city on the Yangtze in southern Jiangsu, China

See also
Changchow dialect (disambiguation)